Ambrosia is a brand of food products in the United Kingdom. Its original product was a dried milk powder for infants, but it is now mostly known for its custard and rice pudding. The brand plays on the fact that it is made in Devon, England, (at a factory in Lifton), with their original punning strapline "Devon knows how they make it so creamy".

History
The Ambrosia Creamery was founded in 1917 by Alfred Morris, in his home village Lifton in Devon, to make rich food for infants. He took milk from local farms, where most of the cows were the Red Ruby breed, and dried it with roller dryers.

The product soon came to the attention of the British armed forces, who took significant quantities for its soldiers, still fighting in the First World War.

Just prior to the Second World War, the Ambrosia creamery was the first company to start making creamed rice pudding ready in a tin. Following the outbreak of war, the vast majority of production was placed in Red Cross food parcels.

After the end of hostilities, Ambrosia relaunched the product, along with a creamed macaroni pudding.

In 1957, following increasing demand, the creamery opened a new factory near to the original production facility.

In 1990 the entire company was acquired by Colman's Ltd., a famous brand of mustard. This, in turn, was bought out by Unilever in 2001. Unilever sold the brand on in 2004, to Premier Foods, where it is still a core brand, alongside others such as Bisto, Oxo and Sharwood's.

In November 2018, Premier Foods announced that they were investigating the sale of the Ambrosia factory and brand in a move to focus on its growing brands, such as Batchelors and Mr Kipling, and to accelerate the rate at which it pays down its £510m debt. This sale offer was later withdrawn.

Marketing
In the late 1990s, there were commercials on the Ambrosia splat custards which featured custard splatting into the face of a man who licks it off and replies "Mmmm; strawberry/banana/chocolate flavour" and finally, the end of the theme from Roobarb can be heard.

In 1999 Ambrosia launched Ambrosia Splat Custard, aimed at young children. As part of their marketing, they sponsored a popular Saturday-morning kids' TV show SMTV Live, and, in 2002, Panto.ie's annual pantomime in Dublin.

As of the release of Ambrosia Rice pots in 2012, the slogan was changed to "Devon knows it's unbelievably good".

References

External links
Brand website
Premier Foods website

Food manufacturers of the United Kingdom
Ambrosia
Companies based in Devon
British brands